Arsen Chilingaryan (1965 - 14 May 2013) was a Soviet Armenian football defender.

Chilingaryan was born in Yerevan.  He made his debut in the Soviet Top League in 1984 for FC Ararat Yerevan. He managed Armenian clubs FC Van Yerevan, Gandzasar FC, FC Armavir, FC Kotayk, Ulisses FC and Armenia U-17. He died in Grenoble after a long illness.

References

External links
 Arsen Chilingaryan 

1965 births
2013 deaths
Soviet footballers
Armenian footballers
FC Mika players
FC Ararat Yerevan players
Armenian football managers
FC Armavir managers
FC Kotayk Abovyan managers
FC Gandzasar Kapan managers
Footballers from Yerevan
Soviet Armenians
Soviet Top League players

Association football defenders